Atocha Municipality is the second municipal section of the Sud Chichas Province in the Potosí Department in Bolivia. Its seat is Atocha. It is located within the Andes mountain range.

Subdivision 
Atocha Municipality was created on September 21, 1963 by Law No. 245  consisting of the following seven cantons: Chocaya, Portugalete, San Vicente, Santa Bárbara, Tacmari, Guadalupe and Chorolque Viejo.

The National Institute of Statistics of Bolivia INE lists eight divisions of the municipality of Atocha: Atocha, Chorolque, Chorolque Viejo, Portugalete, Chocaya, Guadalupe, San Vicente, Santa Bárbara.

The people 
The people are predominantly indigenous citizens of Quechua descent.

Languages 
The languages spoken in the municipality are mainly Spanish and Quechua .

Ref: obd.descentralizacion.gov.bo

Places of interest 
The colonial settlement Atocha Viejo ("Old Atocha") as well as the land relief  are a tourist attraction.

See also 
 Kunturillu
 Santa Bárbara (Chorolque)
 Siete Suyos
 Wila Qullu

References

External links 

 Atocha Municipality: population data and map (PDF; 625 kB)

Municipalities of Potosí Department